Russell Watson Keeney (December 29, 1897 – January 11, 1958) was a U.S. Representative from Illinois.

Born in Pittsfield, Illinois, Keeney attended grade and high schools in Naperville, Illinois.
He graduated from De Paul University, Chicago, Illinois, in 1919 and in 1921.
He was admitted to the bar in 1919 and commenced the practice of law in Naperville, Illinois.
In 1920 became Justice of the Peace of Lisle Township and in 1924 town clerk.
He served as assistant State's attorney until 1935.
State's attorney of Du Page County 1936-1939.
County judge of Du Page County 1940-1952.
Circuit judge of the sixteenth judicial district of Illinois 1953-1956.

Keeney was elected as a Republican to the Eighty-fifth Congress and served from January 3, 1957, until his death in Bethesda, Maryland, January 11, 1958. Keeney voted against the Civil Rights Act of 1957.
He was interred in Naperville (Illinois) Protestant Cemetery.

See also
 List of United States Congress members who died in office (1950–99)

References

1897 births
1958 deaths
Illinois state court judges
Republican Party members of the United States House of Representatives from Illinois
20th-century American judges
People from Pittsfield, Illinois
Politicians from Naperville, Illinois
20th-century American politicians